Dalgaon railway station  is the railway station which serves the town of Birpara in the Indian state of West Bengal. It lies in the New Jalpaiguri–Alipurduar–Samuktala Road line of Northeast Frontier Railway zone, Alipurduar railway division.

Trains
Major trains running from Dalgaon Railway Station are as follows:
Udaipur City–Kamakhya Kavi Guru Express
Delhi-Alipurduar Mahananda Express
Sealdah-Alipurduar Kanchan Kanya Express
Kamakhya-Patna Capital Express
Jhajha–Dibrugarh Weekly Express
Siliguri Bamanhat Intercity Express.
Siliguri–Alipurduar Intercity Express
Siliguri–Dhubri Intercity Express

References

Railway stations in West Bengal
Alipurduar railway division
Railway stations in Alipurduar district